Poompuhar is a state assembly constituency in Mayiladuthurai district in Tamil Nadu. It is one of the 234 State Legislative Assembly Constituencies in Tamil Nadu, in India. Elections and Winners from this constituency are listed below.

Election Results

2021

2016

2011

2006

2001

1996

1991

1989

1984

1980

1977

References 

 

Assembly constituencies of Tamil Nadu
Mayiladuthurai district